The University of Pittsburgh School of Health and Rehabilitation Sciences (or SHRS) is an international leader in rehabilitation and disabilities education, research and community service. The School's faculty, students and alumni are dedicated to building a world free of barriers and disparities that allows all people, regardless of health, to have opportunities to participate in life to the fullest. Pitt SHRS includes some of the nation's top-ranked graduate programs including physical therapy, occupational therapy, speech-language pathology and audiology.

History
The school was founded in 1969 as the School of Health Related Professions. By 1971, the school had 23 full-time faculty members and had graduated 31 students with bachelor's degrees, 10 with master's degrees and 18 with post-baccalaureate certificates. Focused from its creation on entry-level professional education, the school began to focus more on research and advanced graduate school after 1989, under the guidance of then senior vice chancellor for health sciences Thomas Detre. The name of the school was changed in 1991 after Clifford E. Brubaker became Dean, at which time it was expanded with new programs and departments. In 2009-2010, the faculty had grown to over 100, with over 1,100 enrolled students.

Academics
SHRS offers undergraduate programs in: Athletic Training, Communication Science, Emergency Medicine, Health Information Management, Nutrition Science, and Rehabilitation Science. Graduate programs include: Audiology (AuD)/Speech-Language Pathology (MA/MS, CScD), Communication Science & Disorders (PhD), Health Informatics (MS), Nutrition & Dietetics (MS), Occupational Therapy (OTD, MS), Physical Therapy (DPT, MS), Physician Assistant Studies (MS), Prosthetics & Orthotics (MS), Clinical Rehabilitation and Mental Health Counseling (MS), Rehabilitation Technology (MRT), Rehabilitation Science (PhD), Sports Medicine (MS), and Sports Science (MS).

According to the most current rankings, the U.S. News & World Report listed the school as among the "top graduate programs to prepare...for a successful career" in the United States in the field of Physical Therapy, where it tied for first in the nation. The school also ranked third in Occupational Therapy and Speech-Language Pathology, and seventh in Audiology.

Research
SHRS faculty and students are active in basic, translational and clinical research. In 2017, SHRS budgets exceeded $21 million in external research funding. Areas of inquiry include: the measurement and study of motion; balance disorders; human performance; hearing disorders; speech, language and cognitive disorders; neuropsychological parameters; telerehabilitation; wheelchair performance and design; and data mining. SHRS research typically involves faculty from multiple departments, schools, as well as other institutions.

Clinical collaborations include several programs of the University of Pittsburgh Medical Center (e.g., Center for Assistive Technology, Institute for Rehabilitation and Research, Centers for Rehabilitation Services, Center for Sports Medicine, Comprehensive Spine Center, Facial Nerve Center).

See also

 University of Pittsburgh Medical Center
 University of Pittsburgh School of Medicine

References

External links
 Website

Educational institutions established in 1969
Health and Rehabilitation Sciences
Rehabilitation medicine organizations based in the United States
1969 establishments in Pennsylvania
University of Pittsburgh Medical Center